Jiang Jianguo (born December 1956) is a politician of the People's Republic of China. He has been Director of the State Council Information Office and Deputy Director of the Publicity Department of the Chinese Communist Party from January 2015 to August 2018. He formerly served as Deputy Director of State Administration of Press, Publication, Radio, Film and Television. Prior to his positions in the national government, he served as Communist Party Secretary of Shaoyang city, and Mayor of Xiangtan city in his native Hunan province.

Jiang was born in December 1956 in Hanshou County, Hunan province. He joined the Chinese Communist Party in January 1975, and entered the work force in September 1977. He graduated from Hunan University and has a master's degree in engineering.

Jiang is a member of the 18th Central Committee of the Chinese Communist Party.

References

Living people
1956 births
Chinese Communist Party politicians from Hunan
People's Republic of China politicians from Hunan
Politicians from Changde
Hunan University alumni